Siheung Citizen FC is a South Korean football club based in the city of Siheung. The club is a member of the K3 League, a semi-professional league and South Korea's third tier league.

Season-by-season records

Current squad
As of 2 July 2022

See also
 List of football clubs in South Korea

References

External links
Official website 

K3 League clubs
K4 League clubs
K3 League (2007–2019) clubs
Association football clubs established in 2015
2015 establishments in South Korea
Siheung
Sport in Gyeonggi Province